Ryley is a village in central Alberta, Canada. It is surrounded by Beaver County, along Highway 14 between the City of Edmonton and the Town of Viking. The village was named in 1908 after George Urquhart Ryley, Grand Trunk Pacific Railway Land Commissioner at the time.

Demographics 

In the 2016 Census of Population conducted by Statistics Canada, the Village of Ryley recorded a population of 483 living in 208 of its 235 total private dwellings, a  change from its 2011 population of 497.

Governance 
As set out by the Alberta Municipal Government Act, and overseen by Alberta Municipal Affairs, the village is governed by five councillors, who are elected at-large every four years. Brian Ducherer is the mayor, one of the Councillors selected and appointed by the others. The chief administrative officer, is the head of village administration.

Attractions
Ryley boasts many facilities, such as Alberta's only indoor swimming pool in a village, a school which operates four days a week, a museum, a three-sheet indoor curling rink, an outdoor skating rink, a skate park, and a community hall.

See also 
List of communities in Alberta
List of villages in Alberta

References

External links 

1910 establishments in Alberta
Beaver County, Alberta
Villages in Alberta